The men's 1000 metres races of the 2015–16 ISU Speed Skating World Cup 5, arranged in the Sørmarka Arena in Stavanger, Norway, were held on 30 and 31 January 2016.

Pavel Kulizhnikov of Russia won race one, while Kjeld Nuis of the Netherlands came second, and Denis Yuskov of Russia came third. Pim Schipper of the Netherlands won the first Division B race.

Kulizhnikov and Nuis also took the top two places in race two, while Thomas Krol of the Netherlands finished in third place. Mikhail Kazelin of Russia won the second Division B race.

Race 1
Race one took place on Saturday, 30 January, with Division B scheduled in the morning session, at 09:09, and Division A scheduled in the afternoon session, at 14:55.

Division A

Division B

Race 2
Race two took place on Saunday, 31 January, with Division B scheduled in the morning session, at 11:20, and Division A scheduled in the afternoon session, at 15:45.

Division A

Division B

References

Men 1000
5